FN Canis Majoris is a binary star system in the southern constellation Canis Major, near the northern constellation border with Monoceros. It is dimly visible to the naked eye with a combined apparent visual magnitude of 5.41. The system is located at a distance of approximately 3,000 light years from the Sun based on parallax, and is drifting further away with a radial velocity of +31 km/s. It is a runaway star associated with the Sh 2-296 nebula in the CMa OB1 association, and has a conspicuous bow-shock feature.

The brighter component is a visual magnitude 5.69 B-type star that has been assigned various stellar classification from B0 III/IV to B2 Ia/ab, suggesting it is an evolved state. In the past it was classified as a Beta Cephei type variable star with an apparent magnitude that was measured varing between +5.38 and +5.42 over a period of 36.7 hours, but is no longer considered to be one. This is a massive star with estimates ranging from 19 to 36 times the mass of the Sun, and luminosity estimates of 122,079 to 690,000 times the Sun's luminosity.

References

B-type giants
Canis Major
Canis Majoris, FN
2678
053974
34301
Durchmusterung objects
Binary stars